This is a list of Stargate audiobooks produced by Big Finish Productions. The series of audiobooks began in April 2008 and concluded in December 2012, with 18 instalments released in total. The audiobooks are based around characters and story elements from the military science fiction television shows Stargate SG-1 and Stargate Atlantis, with SG-1 initially running from July 1997 until March 2007 and Atlantis running from July 2004 until January 2009. A number of the main and reoccurring cast members from both SG-1 and Atlantis feature in the partially dramatised audiobooks. Specifically written score and sound effects taken from the shows are used throughout.

The license for Big Finish to make any new, or sell their existing Stargate audiobooks expired in 2015 and as a result, copies were only available secondhand. In July 2022, Big Finish announced that they would be re-releasing their audiobooks as digital downloads, with new artwork to celebrate the 25th Anniversary of the Stargate television franchise.

Development and production

Big Finish Productions were first given the rights to release Stargate audiobooks by MGM in 2008, with the first series consisting of six productions which were released monthly from April to September 2008. Three of the productions were based around the characters and elements from Stargate SG-1 and three from Stargate Atlantis, with a cast member from the show reading the story and a second voice actor supporting. A number of authors responsible for Stargate novels, including James Swallow and Sally Malcolm were chosen to write for the series, with Sharon Gosling, who had previously written for the Stargate Official Magazine writing and also serving as producer. Swallow described the productions as a "halfway-house between a traditional talking book and a full-cast audio play", with music, sound effects taken from the television shows and dialogue spoken in the character's voice. 
Shanks recorded "Gift of the Gods" in London. Many of the stories take place at different points in the Stargate timeline, with "Shell Game" taking place after the Stargate SG-1 episode "The Pegasus Project", whilst "Zero Point" takes place after the Stargate Atlantis episode "Reunion".

A second series was announced by Big Finish in January 2009 for monthly releases starting that May. In some cases, the actors were able to record their parts in the same studio, with Nicolas Briggs and Kavan Smith recording together in London, whilst Christopher Judge and Paul McGillion recorded their parts in Canada, with their scene partner Noel Clark and Neil Roberts recording separately sometime later.

A third series was first mentioned discussed by Big Finish in March 2010, however it wasn't officially announced until January 2012. For the third series, Big Finish noted there had been demand from fans for the audiobooks to feature a full cast of characters, although producer Paul Spagg joked that it could not be the full cast of SG-1 or Atlantis as it "might have bankrupted us before we’d started". The series would star Michael Shanks and Claudia Black, reprising their characters of Daniel Jackson and Vala Mal Doran with Spragg commenting "Their chemistry in both Stargate SG-1 and our series one audio Shell Game was fantastic, and it was a no-brainer to once more pair them up". Spragg and fellow producer Jason Haigh-Ellery were also able cast Cliff Simon, who portrays the Goa'uld System Lord Ba'al in SG-1 after the pair were introduced to Simon at a convention. Script supervisor James Swallow assembled the writers room for the series, reenlisting Sally Malcolm and Sharon Gosling who had worked on the first two series, and bringing Peter J. Evans, Richard Dinnick and Steve Lyons onboard. The series would consist of two trilogies of episodes, with the intention that the stories be self-contained with an over-aching story to each trilogy. Spragg noted they had originally considered the series being a six-part story but ultimately decided against it "as nothing had lasted longer than three episodes on TV". Jason Haigh-Ellery directed Claudia Black and Cliff Simon's sessions in a studio in Los Angeles. Michael Shanks's parts were recorded in his native home of Vancouver, Canada, with directions given by Lisa Bowerman over Skype from Big Finish's London studio. Both part 1 and 2 are set during the events of season ten of Stargate SG-1. For the second triolgy, Michael Shanks was asked to not only play his character of Daniel Jackson, but also Thor, who he also voiced throughout the run of the television series.

Cast and characters

Returning Stargate Cast and Reoccurring Actors

Guests

Series 1
 Timothy Watson as Minister Vilith
 Sarah Douglas as Dr. Gilbert
 Toby Longworth as Luka Biass
 Ursula Burton as Helen Sharpe

Series 2
 Noel Clarke as Sebe't
 Beth Chalmers as Gina Roberts
 Nicholas Briggs as Dr. David Glennie
 Neil Roberts as Archus
 Aidan J. David as Argan Loci

Releases

Series 1 (2008)

Series 2 (2009)

Series 3 (2012)

References

External links
 Big Finish Audio Dramas on fansite Gateworld
 Stargate hub on the Big Finish official website.

Stargate
Big Finish Productions